The Minister for the Climate (Swedish: Klimatministern) is a cabinet minister within the Swedish Government and appointed by the Prime Minister of Sweden.

The minister is responsible for issues regarding the Climate. The current Minister for the Climate is Romina Pourmokhtari, appointed on 18 October 2022. She concurrently serves as Minister for the Environment.

Lists of Ministers for the Climate

Ministry history 
The office of Minister for the Climate have been under several different ministries since its founding in 2014.

Government ministers of Sweden